James Graham, 8th Duke of Montrose (born 6 April 1935), known as Earl of Kincardine until 1954 and Marquess of Graham between 1954 and 1992, is a Southern Rhodesia-born hereditary peer of the Peerage of Scotland and a British Conservative Party politician.

Biography

Parents
The Duke was born in Southern Rhodesia, where his father, then the Marquess of Graham, was establishing a farm.

Marriage
On 31 January 1970, as Marquess of Graham, he married Catherine Elizabeth MacDonell Young (d. 29 October 2014), of Canada.

They have three children: 
 Lady Hermione Elizabeth Graham (born 20 July 1971), married 1998 Christopher John Thornhill
 John Graham Thornhill (born 1998)
 Grace Graham Thornhill (born 1998)
 James Alexander Norman Graham, Marquess of Graham (born 16 August 1973), married 2004 Cecilia Manfredi, without issue
 Lord Ronald John Christopher Graham (born 13 October 1975), married 24 September 2016 to Florence Mary Arbuthnott, in Kidderminster, Worcestershire, England. He is a practising lawyer with a firm in England and has two sons.

Education
The Duke attended boarding school in Scotland, first in Aberdeenshire and after that at the Loretto School near Edinburgh.

Politics and international relations
The Duke considers himself a Conservative and took his seat in the House of Lords on his father's death in 1992. He is one of four dukes to have re-entered the House (of the 24 non-royal dukes eligible) following the House of Lords Act 1999, having been one of the 90 peers chosen or elected by the others sitting. The other dukes in the upper house among these are The Duke of Somerset, who won a by-election in December 2014, The Duke of Wellington, who won a by-election in September 2015, and The Duke of Norfolk who, as hereditary Earl Marshal and one of the Great Officers of State, does not have to stand for election.

The Duke of Montrose was a shadow minister for the Scotland Office before the 2010 general election. He has also spent some time in China promoting renewable energy and environmental measures, and he is a fluent speaker of Mandarin.

References

External links
James Graham, 8th Duke of Montrose, Chief of the Grahams
James Graham, 8th Duke of Montrose, thePeerage.com
Conservative Party website 

Conservative Party (UK) hereditary peers
208
1935 births
Living people
People educated at Loretto School, Musselburgh
James
Hereditary peers elected under the House of Lords Act 1999